Matej Kopecký (born 9 June 1990) is a Slovak football goalkeeper who currently plays for 4. liga club FC Slovan Galanta.

References

External links
 at fcnitra.sk 

1990 births
Living people
Slovak footballers
Association football goalkeepers
FC Nitra players
MŠK Púchov players
Slovak Super Liga players